{{DISPLAYTITLE:C4H8}}
The molecular formula C4H8 (molar mass: 56.11 g/mol) may refer to:

Butenes (butylenes)
1-Butene, or 1-butylene
2-Butene
Isobutylene
Cyclobutane
Methylcyclopropane

Molecular formulas